North Korea–Syria relations have been very strong and close since the 1960s, when North Korea provided military assistance to Syria in its wars with Israel. Both states maintain embassies in the other country's respective capitals.

North Korea built a nuclear reactor in Syria based on the design of its own reactor at Yongbyon, and North Korean officials traveled regularly to the site. The Syrian reactor was destroyed by Israel in an airstrike in 2007. The United States signed the Iran, North Korea, Syria Nonproliferation Act in 2000.

In 2012, North Korean leader Kim Jong-un expressed support for the Syrian President Bashar al-Assad in face of a growing civil war. In September 2015, the Syrian government paid tribute to Kim Il-sung in a ceremony for a new park in Damascus named in his honor. In 2016, there were reports that North Korean Special Forces were fighting to defend the Syrian government in the Syrian Civil War. North Korea also expressed interest in helping Syria in post-war reconstruction. In 2018, Bashar al-Assad said that he will visit North Korea to meet with Kim Jong-un. A United Nations report released in 2018 alleged that North Korea was helping Syria in developing chemical weapons.

References 

 
Bilateral relations of Syria
Syria